is a Japanese ramen food-service business specializing in tonkotsu ramen. The chain restaurant began in Fukuoka in 1960 as a ramen stall named "Futaba Ramen" (屋台双葉ラーメン). It was later renamed "Ichiran"（一蘭 "one orchid"）in 1966. After three decades of serving ramen from a single location, under the leadership of CEO Manabu Yoshitomi it opened its first concept store in 1993, which became the blueprint for all future Ichiran ramen shop locations.

Locations

In November 2016, Ichiran USA opened a noodle factory and restaurant in the Bushwick neighborhood of Brooklyn in New York City. It imports its key components, broth and spicy red sauce, from Japan as of 2016. After trying to open in New York for 10 years, it abandoned an earlier plan of opening a restaurant in Manhattan due to regulations and logistics challenges.

By 2017 Ichiran had expanded across Japan to more than 65 locations. Outside of Japan, Ichiran has restaurants in Hong Kong, Taipei, and Brooklyn, New York. The pricing of the New York restaurant has been subject to criticism (tonkotsu ramen costs $18.90 there); Ichiran's director of operations Hana Isoda argues that the prices are not far from New York City's other top ramen restaurants. The Brooklyn location has both tables and booths. A Midtown, Manhattan location based on  its solo dining concept will open on West 31st Street, between Sixth and Seventh avenues.  Ichiran  planned to open at least three new U.S. locations by 2020.

See also

 Ramen shop

References

External links
 
 

Ramen shops
Fast-food chains of Japan
Fukuoka